Sympistis hayesi is a moth of the family Noctuidae first described by Augustus Radcliffe Grote in 1873. It is found in the Rocky Mountain region of North America.

The wingspan is about 30 mm.

References

hayesi
Moths of North America